Decision Before Dawn is a 1951 American war film directed by Anatole Litvak, starring Richard Basehart, Oskar Werner, and Hans Christian Blech. It tells the story of the U.S. Army using potentially unreliable German prisoners of war to gather intelligence as clandestine "line-crossers" in the closing days of World War II. The film was adapted by Peter Viertel and Jack Rollens (uncredited) from the novel Call It Treason by George Howe.

Plot
By late 1944, as the Allies march toward the Rhine, it is obvious that Germany will lose the war. American Colonel Devlin (Gary Merrill) leads a military intelligence unit that recruits German prisoners of war to spy on their former comrades. "Tiger" (Hans Christian Blech), a cynical, older thief and ex-circus worker, is willing to work for the winning side. On the other hand, "Happy" (Oskar Werner) is a young idealist who only volunteers to spy after his friend is killed by fanatical fellow prisoners for voicing doubts about the war's outcome. Monique (Dominique Blanchar), a former French resistance operative, trains Happy and the others in espionage techniques; she takes a liking to the young man despite her hatred for the Germans.

One day, Devlin receives word that a Wehrmacht general is willing to negotiate the surrender of his entire corps. Given top priority, the mission is assigned  an American officer to oversee the German agents. Devlin selects Lieutenant Rennick (Richard Basehart), a newcomer who dislikes and distrusts the turncoats. Tiger is chosen because he is the only one who knows the area, but he is under suspicion after returning from his last mission without his partner. Happy is assigned the related task of locating the 11th Panzer Corps, which might oppose the wholesale defection. They parachute out of the same plane into Germany, then split up.

In the course of his search Happy encounters Germans with differing attitudes towards the war. On bus and train rides, in guest houses and taverns, and in military convoys braving Allied air raids, he meets the still defiant, such as Waffen-SS courier Scholtz (Wilfried Seyferth), and the resigned, like the young war widow turned hooker Hilde (Hildegard Knef). Happy locates the 11th Panzer by stroke of luck. Posing as a medic returning to his unit, he is commandeered to treat its commander, Oberst von Ecker (O.E. Hasse), at his castle headquarters. Choosing military discipline over sentiment, von Ecker orders the execution of a loyal officer who had deserted to help his bombed-out family.  When von Ecker has a heart attack, Happy has the opportunity to inject him with a lethal overdose of medicine, but refrains from doing so.

Afterwards, Happy narrowly escapes being captured by the Gestapo. He makes his way to a safe house in the ruins of the heavily bombed Mannheim, where the other two agents are hiding out. Meanwhile, Tiger and Rennick have learned that the general whom they were to contact has supposedly been injured, but the hospital where he has been taken is under Waffen-SS guard; without him, the other German officers cannot and will not surrender to the Allies.

As their radio has been knocked out, Happy, Tiger, and Rennick are forced to try make their way to the banks of the Rhine, where they hope to swim across to reach the American-held lines on the western side. At the last moment, Tiger loses his nerve and runs away, forcing Rennick to shoot and kill him, lest the details of their mission and the turncoat German spy program be revealed. Rennick and Happy then swim to an island in the middle of the river. When they are about to start for the far shore they are spotted.  Facing torture and being shot either for deserting or treason, Happy nonetheless bravely draws the German troops' attention away from Rennick by surrendering. His sacrifice enables the lieutenant to make it to safety, with a changed attitude about some Germans.

Cast
 Oskar Werner as Corporal Karl Maurer ("Happy")
 Richard Basehart as Lieutenant Dick Rennick
 Hans Christian Blech as Sergeant Rudolf Barth ("Tiger")
 Gary Merrill as Colonel Devlin
 Hildegard Knef as Hilde
 Wilfried Seyferth as Heinz Scholtz
 Dominique Blanchar as Monique
 O.E. Hasse as Oberst (Colonel) von Ecker
 Helene Thimig as Paula Schneider

Production
The citizens of the cities of Würzburg, Nürnberg, and Mannheim, where some of the picture's battle scenes were shot, were forewarned of their filming by newspaper and radio announcements.  Some were overseen by the U.S. military, as Germany was still under military occupation at the time the film was shot.

Reception
At the 24th Academy Awards, Decision Before Dawn was nominated for the Best Picture Oscar, with Dorothy Spencer nominated for Best Film Editing.

Bob Thomas praised the film in his 1951 newspaper column, describing it as "movie-making at its best. ... By using the real German cities and people, this film has created a stirring and realistic picture of a dying nation." He also praised the performances of Basehart, Merrill and Werner.

Upon seeing the film, General Douglas MacArthur said "This is the finest picture I have seen this year, and I nominate it for an Academy Award."

In a 2000s review, Chicago Reader film critic J. R. Jones was less enthused, writing "By the time Fox released this 1952 feature, the patriotic orthodoxy of Hollywood war movies had softened enough to allow for a German hero, but not a very engaging one; the inherent drama of his divided loyalty is mostly bypassed in favor of a slack espionage plot." However, Jones applauded Werner's "magnetic performance" and thought that Knef "is devastating in her brief turn as a war-weary hooker."

In 2008 Emanuel Levy called Decision Before Dawn a "stirring drama ... And while not made as an explicitly agit-prop, it does convey its humanist anti-war message, without the usual sentimentality."

References

External links
 
 
 
 
 

1951 films
1951 war films
American spy films
American war films
American black-and-white films
Films about the German Resistance
Films based on military novels
Films scored by Franz Waxman
Films directed by Anatole Litvak
20th Century Fox films
Western Front of World War II films
World War II spy films
1950s English-language films
1950s American films
Films set in Germany
Films set in 1944
Films shot in Munich
Films shot in Bavaria
Films shot in Germany